Johmari Logtenberg (born 22 February 1989) is a South African former cricketer who played primarily as a right-handed batter. She appeared in three Test matches, 26 ODIs and two Twenty20 Internationals for South Africa between 2003 and 2007. She became the youngest player, male or female, to score a half-century in international cricket when she hit 74 on Test debut, aged 14. She played domestic cricket for KwaZulu-Natal.

Career
Logtenberg made her Test debut for South Africa during their tour of England in 2003, aged 14 years and 166 days, becoming the second youngest Test player of all time. She scored 74 off 235 balls in South Africa's first innings and took one wicket in England's. She made her ODI debut a week later against the same opposition.

During England's tour of South Africa in early 2004, Logtenberg further enhanced her reputation by finishing the five match ODI series as South Africa's leading runscorer. Scoring fifties in the first and fifth match of the series. She was selected in the South Africa squad for the 2005 World Cup and played in all six of the sides match, scoring 98 runs.

In the 2005/06 season she became the first women to pass 1,000 runs in the Provincial League, reaching the landmark in 19 innings, her average at the time was 176.16. She was not dismissed at all in the 2005/06 season, during which she scored 431 runs. In the previous season she had scored 414 runs at an average of 207. At the 2006 South African Cricket Awards she was named Women's Cricketer of the Year.

In January 2007 Logtenberg recorded her maiden ODI century, scoring 103 not out off 112 balls against Pakistan. She finished the ODI series with 188 runs at an average of 94.00 and was named 'Batsman of the Series'. In August 2007 playing against the Netherlands she became the only South African women to score two ODI centuries, with an innings of 153 not out. The score is the eighth highest in women's ODI cricket and the highest by a South African.

In January 2008 Cricket South Africa announced that Logtenberg's omission from the World Cup qualifying squad was because she had quit cricket and had taken up golf. Logtenberg cited the lack of finances in women's cricket as a reason for the switch.

One Day International centuries

See also 
 List of centuries in women's One Day International cricket

References

External links
 
 
Womens Golf South Africa Profile

1989 births
Living people
People from Vanderbijlpark
South African women cricketers
South Africa women Test cricketers
South Africa women One Day International cricketers
South Africa women Twenty20 International cricketers
KwaZulu-Natal Coastal women cricketers